A  is a collective term for Japanese organizations such as test and research laboratories, inspection and certification institutes, educational and training facilities, medical and rehabilitation facilities, reformatory and internment facilities, and work facilities that are established under the Cabinet Office or other governmental organizations (ministries, commissions and agencies) set forth in Article 3, paragraph 2 of the . It is distinguished from an extraordinary organ. The classification was created on 1 July 1985 when an amendment to the National Government Organization Act was put into effect.

List of the facilities 

 Cabinet Office
 Economic and Social Research Institute
 State Guest Houses (Akasaka Palace / Kyoto State Guest House)
 Imperial Household Agency
 Office of the Shōsōin Treasure House
 Imperial Stock Farms
 Ministry of Internal Affairs and Communications
 Local Autonomy College
 Institute for Information and Communications Policy
 Statistical Research and Training Institute
 Fire and Disaster Management Agency
 Fire and Disaster Management College
 Ministry of Justice
 Prisons (59)
 Juvenile Prisons (8)
 Detention Houses (7)
 Juvenile Training Schools (52)
 Juvenile Classification Homes (52)
 Women's Guidance Home (1)
 Immigration Detention Centers (3)
 Research and Training Institute of the Ministry of Justice
 Training Institute for Correctional Personnel
 Public Security Intelligence Agency
 Training Institute
 Ministry of Foreign Affairs
 Foreign Service Training Institute

 Ministry of Finance
 Policy Research Institute
 Accounting Center
 Central Customs Laboratory
 Customs Training Institute
 National Tax Agency
 National Tax College
 Ministry of Education, Culture, Sports, Science and Technology
 National Institute for Educational Policy Research
 National Institute of Science and Technology Policy
 Ministry of Health, Labour and Welfare
 Quarantine Stations (13)
 National Hansen's Disease Sanatoriums (13)
 National Institute of Health Sciences
 National Institute of Public Health
 National Institute of Population and Social Security Research
 National Institute of Infectious Diseases
 National Homes for Juvenile Training and Education (2)
 National Rehabilitation Center for Persons with Disabilities
 Ministry of Agriculture, Forestry and Fisheries
 Plant Protection Station (4)
 Naha Plant Protection Station
 Animal Quarantine Service
 National Veterinary Assay Laboratory
 Training Institute of Agricultural Administration
 Policy Research Institute

 Forestry Agency
 Forest Training Institute
 Ministry of Economy, Trade and Industry
 Training Institute of Economy, Trade and Industry
 Ministry of Land, Infrastructure, Transport and Tourism
 Policy Research Institute for Land Infrastructure and Transport
 National Institute for Land and Infrastructure Management
 College of Land, Infrastructure and Transport
 Aeronautical Safety College
 Japan Meteorological Agency
 Meteorological Research Institute
 Meteorological Satellite Center
 Aerological Observatory
 Magnetic Observatory
 Meteorological College
 Japan Coast Guard
 Japan Coast Guard Academy
 Japan Coast Guard School
 Ministry of the Environment
 National Environmental Research and Training Institute
 Ministry of Defense
 National Defense Academy
 National Defense Medical College
 National Institute for Defense Studies

References 

Government of Japan